YouthBank UK (YB UK) was a national grant scheme in the United Kingdom, providing small 'Opportunity' grants from £250 to £5,000 from the Youth Opportunity Fund (YOF) and Larger grants from £5,000 to £25,000 from the Youth Capital Fund (YCF) grants for young people to help individuals and groups fund projects to help the community. Both YB UK and local groups are led and run completely by young people usually with a Youth bank project manager as part of a County Council, helping them learn new skills, meet their needs and aid their communities. YB UK puts the money in the hands of young people, and is run at both a local area and national level by groups of young people, but adults can help as supporters, facilitators and advisors. YB UK is a registered charity, registered charity number, 1113047.

YouthBank UK went into the administration process in 2011 due to financial difficulty.

YouthBank Scotland has continued with the support of Youthlink Scotland to support the network of YouthBanks in Scotland. YouthBank Ireland has also continued to move forward, however had started to move away from YouthBank UK before it went into administration.

Background and history 
In 1999, five organisations, British Youth Council, Changemakers, the Community Foundation Network, the National Youth Agency and The Prince's Trust, who becameYB UK'''s consortium partners, set up seven pilot YouthBanks, in Bristol, Bradford, Highlands and Islands of Scotland, Northern Ireland, Northumberland, Tyne and Wear and Wales. In September 2001, YB UK was successful in securing a million pound, grant from the Community Fund, to develop a Central Development Unit to expand the pilot YB UK projects.YB UK received major grants from Comic Relief, the Football Foundation, the Department for Education and Skills and Skills National Voluntary Youth Organisation and the Big Lottery Fund's Young People Fund Grants to Organisation programme.

 Local YouthBanks 
After the seven projects received funding via the Community Fund, a Central Development Unit was established to help increase the number of local YouthBanks all around the UK. Youth groups from anywhere in the country can now apply to become a YouthBank for their area. Once a group becomes a YouthBank, they decide how applications are designed and assessed, and decide who receives the grants.

 List of local YouthBanks 
Below is a list of areas that have a functioning YouthBank, according to the official website.

 England
 East Brighton
Camden
Harlow
Peterborough
Tower Hamlets
Norfolk
Buckinghamshire
Bristol
Somerset
Exeter
Leicestershire
Nottinghamshire
Heywood
Old Trafford
Sefton
Salford
Bradford
Keighley
Stockton-on-Tees
Northumberland Tyne and Wear
Allerdale
North East Lincolnshire
Bath and North East Somerset
East Sussex

 Wales
Pembrokeshire
Rhyl

 Northern Ireland
Craigavon
Foyle
Ballymena
Newtownabbey
 St. Gabriels School Girls Model School''

 Scotland

Dumfries and Galloway
Scottish Borders
Tranent
 North Glasgow
Drumchapel
 Greater Easterhouse
Helensburgh
Stirling
Inverness
Ross and Cromarty
Nairnshire
Moray
Fraserburgh
Sutherland
Caithness
Shetland
North Ayrshire
East Fife

References

External links 
 YouthBank Scotland Home Page.

Youth charities based in the United Kingdom
Organisations based in Leicestershire
Development charities based in the United Kingdom
1999 establishments in the United Kingdom